The Ibn Rushd Prize for Freedom of Thought is a prestigious prize awarded in Germany which recognises independent, forward-thinking, individuals or organisations who have contributed to democracy and freedom of speech in the Arab world. 

The prize has been awarded annually since 1999, with the exception of 2016, by the non-governmental Ibn-Rushd-Fund; the fund itself was founded in 1998 on the occasion of the 800th anniversary of the Andalusian philosopher and thinker Ibn Rushd's death (often Latinized as Averroes), and on the 50th anniversary of the UN Declaration of Human Rights.

Prize winners

References

External links 
 Ibn Rushd Fund for Freedom of Thought

Politics awards
Islam and society